The All-Ireland Senior Football Championship (SFC) is the premier competition in Gaelic football. An annual tournament organised by the Gaelic Athletic Association (GAA), it is contested by the county teams in All-Ireland.

The first tournament was held in 1887; it has been held every year since 1889. Each tournament ends with a final, played by the 35th Sunday of the year at Croke Park in Dublin, with the winning team receiving the Sam Maguire Cup.

History
The first Championship to be held featured club teams who represented their respective counties after their county championship. The 21 a-side final was between Commercials of Limerick and Young Irelands of Louth. The final was played in Beech Hill, Donnybrook (not Bird Avenue) on 29 April 1888 with Commercials winning by 1–4 to 0–3. Unlike later All-Ireland competitions, there were no provincial championships, and the result was an open draw.

The second Championship was unfinished owing to the American Invasion Tour. The 1888 provincial championships had been completed (Tipperary, Kilkenny and Monaghan winning them; no Connacht teams entered) but after the Invasion tour returned, the All-Ireland semi-final and final were not played. English team London reached the final four times in the early years of the competition (1900–1903).

In 1892, inter-county teams were introduced to the All-Ireland Championship. Congress granted permission for the winning club to use players from other clubs in the county, thus the inter-county teams came into being. The rules of hurling and football were also altered: goals were made equal to five points, and teams were reduced from 21 to 17 a-side.

The 1903 Championship brought Kerry's first All-Ireland title. They went on to become the most successful football team in the history of the All-Ireland Senior Football Championship.

Unlike in other European countries, such as neighbouring England, where annual sports events were cancelled during the twentieth century due to the First and Second World Wars, the All-Ireland Championship has been running continuously since 1887, with the final running since 1889 (the 1888 competition was played but no final was held due to the Invasion mentioned above). The competition continued even in spite of the effects on the country of the Civil War and the Second World War (the National Football League was not held during the latter). In 1941, the All-Ireland Championship was disrupted by an outbreak of foot-and-mouth disease but the postponed Leinster final were later rescheduled.

The duration of certain championship matches increased from 60 to 80 minutes during the 1970s. They were settled at 70 minutes after five seasons of this in 1975. This applied only to the provincial finals, All-Ireland semi-finals and finals.

The first half of the twentieth century brought the rise of several teams who won two or more All-Ireland titles in that period, such as Kildare, Mayo, Cavan, Wexford and Roscommon. In the 1990s, a significant sea change took place, as the All-Ireland was claimed by an Ulster team in four consecutive years (1991–1994). Since then Ulster has produced more All-Ireland winning teams than any other province.

The All-Ireland Qualifiers were introduced in 2001. Later that year, the 2001 final brought victory for Galway who became the first football team to win an All-Ireland by springing through "the back door." In 2013, Hawk-Eye was introduced for Championship matches at Croke Park. It was first used to confirm that Offaly substitute Peter Cunningham's attempted point had gone wide 10 minutes into the second half of a game against Kildare. 2013 also brought the first Friday night game in the history of the Championship – a first round qualifier between Carlow and Laois.

In recent years further changes have been made to the structure of the championship. In 2018 the Super 8s were introduced, where the four provincial champions and the four-round 4 qualifier winners would be split into two groups of four teams. Each team plays their group rivals once, with the top two teams progressing to the All-Ireland Semi-Finals. In 2022 a two-tier format will be adopted for the championship. Division 3 and 4 teams from the National Football League that fail to reach a provincial final will not proceed to the All-Ireland qualifiers and will instead play in the Tailteann Cup.

Teams

Current championship pyramid 
Teams in the top two levels are separated via the provincial championships and the national football league. Teams from tier 3 may reach tiers 1 and 2 through promotion.

Format

The county is a geographical region in Ireland, and each of the thirty-two counties in Ireland organise their own Gaelic games affairs through a County Board. The county teams play in their respective Provincial Championships (reflective of the four Irish provinces) in Connacht (which also includes teams from London and New York), Leinster, Munster, and Ulster. Kilkenny is currently unique among the 32 Irish county associations in not participating in the All-Ireland Senior Football Championship. The Provincial Championships operate through a knock-out cup competition format.

Historic format (1888–2000)
For the first All-Ireland championship in 1887, the competition was played on an open draw knockout basis. From 1888, the provincial system was introduced, whereby the counties in each of Ireland's four provinces would play each other on a knockout basis to find provincial champions. These four champions would meet in the All-Ireland semi-finals. The structure outlined above was adopted in 2001 to allow more games to be played, but still retain provincial championships and the knockout structure, resulting in every game continuing to be a meaningful fixture, with no dead-rubber league format matches being played out.

Quarter-finals format (2001–2017)
From 2001 to 2017, the Championship was played using the Quarter-finals format. Under this format, Provincial matches would take place during the months of May, June and July. The winners of each of the four Provincial Championships would earn a place in the All-Ireland Quarter-Finals, which would take place in the month of August. Replays would be played for all drawn matches, not just drawn Provincial Finals and drawn All-Ireland Finals. Extra-time would only be used for Replays and Qualifier Matches. If the teams were still level after extra time, the qualifier match would go to a replay or in the case of replays, another replay would take place.

The qualifiers series (also referred to as the "back door") for teams that did not win their provincial championships would take place in the months of June and July with the winning four teams of Round 4 playing the four Provincial Champions in the All-Ireland Quarter Finals.

All-Ireland Quarter-Finals: The four Provincial Champions would be drawn against the winning four teams from Round 4 of the All-Ireland Qualifiers. If a match finished with both teams level, a replay would take place. The four winning teams qualify for the All-Ireland Semi-Finals.
All-Ireland Semi-Finals: The All-Ireland Semi-Finals would take place in August and be contested by the four winners of the All-Ireland Quarter Finals. If a match ended with both teams level, a replay would take place. The two winning teams qualify for the All-Ireland Final.
All-Ireland Final: The two remaining teams would meet in the All-Ireland Final, usually on the third Sunday in September. The winning team is crowned All-Ireland Champions.

Single-tier championship format (2018–2019)
This championship was identical to the format above, though with no second-tier championship all teams who failed to win their provincial final were eligible to play in the qualifiers. The qualifiers took place over four rounds rather than two, and the four winners of the fourth round proceeded to the All-Ireland Super 8s. As in the format above, the further a team progressed in their provincial championships the later the round they entered the qualifiers. The All-Ireland Super 8s were a round-robin group stage, featuring four teams placed into two groups. The two-highest ranked teams from each group were drawn into an All-Ireland Semi-Final, which was followed by the All-Ireland Final.

Return to single-elimination format (2020–2022)
Due to the impact of the COVID-19 pandemic, the 2020 and 2021 championships returned to the historic single-elimination format. Teams that were eliminated in their provincial championships did not access the qualifiers, which were cancelled, and the "Super 8's" were removed in favour of a straight-knockout semi-final and final.

Integration with the league and Tailteann Cup (2023 onwards)
In 2023 the format of the championship will again be altered. Under this system, approved at a Special Congress of the GAA in February 2022, the results in the National Football League (held in January through to March of each year) will have an impact on counties' progression in the championship. After the conclusion of the four provincial championships, whose structures remain unaltered, there will be a round-robin competition for 16 teams, split evenly into four. The groups will be made up of the four provincial champions and four runners-up, joined by a further eight teams based on their overall ranking from the league. The four group winners will automatically qualify for the All-Ireland Quarter Finals, and the four remaining spots in the quarter-finals are determined by playoff-matches between the second and third placed teams. The quarter finals, semi finals and final are then played under the traditional single-elimination format. Furthermore, the 16 teams that fail to qualify for the round-robin stage will compete in the second-tier Tailteann Cup, which is also played via round-robin groups and single-elimination finals.

All-Ireland finals

Typically, over the four Sundays of September, All-Ireland Finals in men's football, ladies' football, hurling and camogie take place at Croke Park, the national stadium of the GAA. Two grades are played on each final day, the senior team and the minor team (consisting of younger players, under the age of 18, who have participated in that year's All-Ireland Minor Football Championship). Guests who attend these events include the President of Ireland, the Taoiseach and other important dignitaries. The football final is considered the pinnacle event of this period.

The final game of the All-Ireland Senior Football Championship takes place on the third Sunday of September. The men's decider regularly attracts crowds of over 80,000. The winning team captain receives the Sam Maguire Cup. The current champions are Kerry.

Due to COVID-19 and the related State restrictions, the 2020 All-Ireland Senior Football Championship Final was staged on Saturday, 19 December, two weeks after the semi-finals.

For the first time since 2000, the football championship was a sudden-death scenario, while the hurling championship – completed on Sunday, 13 December – contained a backdoor format.

Venues

Records and statistics

Roll of Honour 

a.  London received a bye to the final in five seasons.

Although Wexford were the first county to win four consecutive All-Ireland Senior Football Finals (1915–18), historically Kerry has been the most successful football team in the All-Ireland Senior Football Championship. As of 2022, Kerry has won the competition on 38 occasions, winning in four consecutive years twice (1929–1932 and 1978–1981) and for three consecutive years twice as well (1939–1941 and 1984–1986). 
Dublin follows Kerry on the competition roll of honour with 30 wins, although up to the 1950s much of the success of Dublin teams was based on teams who had many non-Dublin born players playing.

Dublin has joined the four in a row club winning the competition consecutively since 2014. As of 2019, Dublin became the first team to win the competition five times in a row. And in 2020, Dublin won a sixth consecutive title. Galway were the first team from the western province of Connacht to win an All-Ireland title, doing so in 1925. The 1933 final brought victory for Cavan, who became the first team from the northern province of Ulster to win an All-Ireland title.

Two teams have won the All-Ireland Senior Football Championship as part of a double with that year's All-Ireland Senior Hurling Championship, namely Cork (1890 and 1990) and Tipperary (1895 and 1900). The championship has never been won by a team from outside Ireland, though London have played in five finals.

Kerry are the reigning champions, winning their thirty-eighth title, having defeated Galway in the 2022 All-Ireland Senior Football Championship Final.

Championship Tiers

2022 Tiers

Defunct championships
 All-Ireland Senior B Football Championship
 Tommy Murphy Cup

See also
 All-Ireland Senior Hurling Championship
 List of All-Ireland Senior Football Championship medal winners
 All-Ireland Senior Club Football Championship
 List of Gaelic games competitions
 Leinster Senior Football Championship
 Ulster Senior Football Championship
 Connacht Senior Football Championship
 Munster Senior Football Championship
Tailteann Cup (Tier 2)
All-Ireland Junior Football Championship (Tier 3)

References

External links

All-Ireland Senior Football Championship at the Gaelic Athletic Association

 
1887 establishments in Ireland
 
Annual events in Ireland
Gaelic football
Recurring sporting events established in 1887